Maurice Albert Young (7 March 1937 – 13 February 2023) was an Australian rules footballer who played with Hawthorn. Young developed into a strong ruckman. He played 71 senior games for Hawthorn between 1956 and 1960. He also played the Hawks' VFL finals campaign in 1957.

In 1961, Maurice moved to Western Australia, and played with  East Perth. He played in the losing East Perth's 1961 Grand Final side.

Two years later he returned to Melbourne to be closer to family. Not required at Hawthorn Young spent 1963 playing for Oakleigh in the VFA.

He later played in premiership teams at Moe in 1967 and Eaglehawk in 1968.

Family
He was the elder brother of Garry Young.

Sources
 Holmesby, Russell & Main, Jim (2007). The Encyclopedia of AFL Footballers. 7th ed. Melbourne: Bas Publishing.

References

External links

Maurie Young's playing statistics from The VFA Project
Maurie Young's playing statistics from WAFL Footy Facts

1937 births
2023 deaths
Australian rules footballers from Victoria (Australia)
Hawthorn Football Club players
East Perth Football Club players
Camberwell Football Club players
Oakleigh Football Club players